Ahsan Ali may refer to:
 Ahsan Ali (cricketer) (born 1993), Pakistani cricketer
 Ahsan Ali (physician) (born 1937), Bangladeshi physician
 Ahsan Ali Syed (born 1973), Indian businessman
 Ahsan Ali Taj (born 1980), Pakistani music composer